Arthur and Merlin is a 2015 independent British feature film directed by Marco van Belle and written by Kat Wood and Marco van Belle. The film, which stars Kirk Barker, Stefan Butler, Nigel Cooke and David Sterne, is based on the original Celtic tales of Arthur and Merlin.

Plot
In Medieval Britain, a time of magic and legend, a powerful druid (Nigel Cooke) is bent on destroying the Celtic people. Arthur (Kirk Barker) a banished warrior, and Merlin (Stefan Butler) a hermit wizard, embark on a heroic quest to stop the druid and save their people, before the Celts are lost forever and become a myth themselves.

Cast

 Kirk Barker as Arthur/Arthfael
 Stefan Butler as Merlin/Myrrdin
 Nigel Cooke as Aberthol
 Charlotte Brimble as Olwen
 Adrian Bouchet as Lucan
 David Sterne as King Vortigern
 Nick Asbury as Orin
 Andrew Grose as Brian
 Garth Maunders as Faelan
 Joseph Attenborough as Eogan
 Jack Rigby as Anyon
 Alison Harris as Branwen
 Jack Maw as young Myrrdin
 Hattie Pardy-McLaughlin as young Nia
 Harvey Walsh as young Arthfael

Release
The film premiered at the BFI Southbank cinema on 11 April 2015. Later in 2015, the film was released digitally on 14 September via iTunes UK and on 6 November via numerous VOD services in the United States. It was also released in DVD format on 21 September in the United Kingdom, on 7 October in France, and will be released on 16 January 2016 in the United States and around the second quarter of 2016 in Germany.

Reception
The film received positive reviews. It was especially praised with regards to the relative quality and atmosphere in the movie when compared to its "shoestring budget".

References

External links
 
 
 

2015 films
Arthurian films
British independent films
2010s English-language films
2010s British films